Saint Mary's High School is a private Catholic high school in Manhasset, New York.  St. Mary's parish is part of the Roman Catholic Diocese of Rockville Centre yet the High School serves families of the Roman Catholic Archdiocese of New York, the Diocese of Brooklyn and the Diocese of Rockville Centre.  It is located off Northern Boulevard at 51 Clapham Avenue, Manhasset, near the Miracle Mile.  St. Mary's Men's Varsity Ice Hockey is the all-time leader in State Championships, winning consecutive titles from 1994-2006.

Starting in 2011 students are issued an iPad configured for educational use. Starting in 2018, students are issued a Chromebook replacing their iPad. Personal devices are not allowed including phones, media players, and computers. In September 2021, the school staff includes two members of the Dominican Sisters of Mary, Mother of the Eucharist.

Notable alumni 
 Pat Buck, professional wrestler, trainer and promoter for All Elite Wrestling
 Kevin Cosgrove, business executive and victim of the September 11 attacks
 Robert Cuccioli, actor and singer
 Matt Gilroy, member of the NHL, New York Rangers, Ottawa Senators, Tampa Bay Lightning, and member of Team USA at the 2018 Winter Olympics
 Danny Green, NBA player for the Memphis Grizzlies
 Dennis Herrera, San Francisco City Attorney
 Chavaughn Lewis (born 1993), basketball player for Hapoel Galil Elyon of the Israeli Basketball Premier League
 Scott Machado (born 1990), basketball player in the Israeli Basketball Premier League
 Doug McIntyre, writer, radio host
 Dave Pietramala, head lacrosse coach at Johns Hopkins University
 Donald Lee Pilling, US Vice Chief of Naval Operations from 1997 to 2000
 Chuck Schilling, Major League Baseball player for Boston Red Sox
 Vanessa Simmons, actress, TV host

Notes and references

External links 
 School Website
 Official School Facebook Page

Catholic secondary schools in New York (state)
Manhasset, New York
Educational institutions established in 1949
Roman Catholic Diocese of Rockville Centre
Schools in Nassau County, New York
1949 establishments in New York (state)